Andrea Thomas may refer to:

 Andrea Thomas (character), fictional character in the TV series The Secrets of Isis
 Andrea Thomas (German athlete) (born 1963), German sprinter (200m)
 Andrea Thomas (Jamaican athlete) (born 1968), Jamaican runner (400m and 800m)
 Andrea Thomas (gymnast) (born 1968), Canadian Olympic gymnast